Vanjan (also Romanized as Vanjān) is a village in Tirchai Rural District, Kandovan District, Meyaneh County, East Azerbaijan Province, Iran. At the 2006 census, its population was 338, in 111 families.

References 

Populated places in Meyaneh County